Jafarabad-e Olya (also Romanized as Ja‘farābād-e ‘Olyā; also known as Ja‘farābād) is a village in Quchan Atiq Rural District, in the Central District of Quchan County, Razavi Khorasan Province, Iran. At the 2006 census, its population was 235, in 64 families.

References 

Populated places in Quchan County